Magnus Choir is a commercial, proprietary music software synthesizer, for the Microsoft Windows and macOS operating systems, written by Daniel Laiseca  and developed by Syntheway Virtual Musical Instruments. The first version was released in 2005.

Overview

This software can be used to create natural and synthetic choirs, vocal textures, choral pads and sustained vowels. It may work as a VST, VST3 or Audio Unit plugin within digital audio workstation software such as FL Studio, Cubase, Logic Pro or GarageBand. Magnus Choir also is compatible with FreeVST  allowing Linux users to use native Microsoft Windows VST plugins by using parts of the Wine compatibility layer.

Preset Sounds
Features 54 built-in preset sounds including a variety of choirs such as male and female mixed in classic SATB (Soprano, Alto, Tenor, Bass) structure: women sing Soprano and Alto, while men sing Tenor and Bass. Additionally includes choir pads, spatial voices, ambient, cinematic and soundscapes.

Modulation Control
Magnus Choir includes modulation control with parameters which may be modulated such as Low-frequency oscillator, ADSR envelope generator, Filter and reverb effect emulation.

See also
Virtual Studio Technology
Audio Units
Synthesizer
Software synthesizer
Digital audio workstation
Musical Instrument Digital Interface

References

External links
Magnus Choir overview
Linux VST Compatibility: FST, Jack, Wine - Linux requirements by Paul Davis.
Syntheway Magnus Choir VST plug-in hosted on FST 1.8 by Dave Phillips (Linux Journal Contributing Editor).
VST3 for Virtual Studio Technology - VST3, New Standard for Virtual Studio Technology.
Cnet (CBS Interactive) Magnus Choir at Cnet (CBS Interactive)
Simtel Directory Magnus Choir at Simtel Digital River

Music software plugin architectures
Software synthesizers
Keyboard software synthesizers
Windows multimedia software
MacOS multimedia software